Alban Berg composed his Three Pieces for Orchestra (German: Drei Orchesterstücke), Op. 6, between 1913 and 1915. They are dedicated to his teacher Arnold Schoenberg. A revised version of the score was published in 1929 by Universal Edition. While the composer conducted a first performance of only the first two movements in 1923, the complete work was premiered in the revised version in Oldenburg in 1930, conducted by Johannes Schüler.

History 
Berg composed the Three Pieces between 1913 and 1915. Studying with Arnold Schönberg, he had composed mainly lieder such as Altenberg Lieder, and thought about a larger composition, such as a suite or a symphony. He settled with orchestral pieces, and worked on them in Trahütten, Styria, in summer, where his parents-in-law had a country estate. The work was completed on 23 August 1914.

Berg dedicated it "to my teacher and friend Arnold Schönberg with immeasurable gratitude and love", and sent it to  Schönberg as a gift for his 40th birthday, on 13 September 1914. In a letter he expanded: "I have truly striven to give my best, to follow all your incentives and suggestions, whereby the unforgettable, yea revolutionising experiences of the Amsterdam rehearsals and thorough study of your orchestra pieces served me boundlessly and sharpened my self-criticism more and more."

The premiere of the first two pieces was held in Berlin on 5 June 1923 during an Austrian Music Week, conducted by Anton Webern. It was not until 14 April 1930 that the complete composition was played, in its revised form, by the Oldenburger Landesorchester conducted by Johannes Schüler.

Structure
The three pieces are:
 Präludium (Prelude)
An instrumentally colourful, impressionistic prelude. After a murmuring introduction, an evocative, wide-ranging theme is stated by bassoons and violins, and then fully developed.
 Reigen (Round Dance)
Replete with both waltz music and Ländler music, this piece demonstrates an inherent eclecticism that, as in many of Berg's works, permitted a synthesis of old and new, classical and popular, often infused with grotesquerie.
 Marsch (March)
A sizable and highly imaginative march, notable for its element of chaos and its extremes of orchestration.

The score is marked for the possibility of playing the two first movements alone, as at the premiere. When the complete work was premiered, Berg compared the sequence of three movements to a symphony, Reigen taking the position of a Scherzo, and Marsch as a finale. Derrick Puffett suggested that the title may allude to Arthur Schnitzler's play Reigen, of which Berg owned a copy.

Adorno wrote about the finale in his 1968 analysis of Berg works, connecting it to Schoenberg's Five Pieces for Orchestra and Mahler's Ninth Symphony:

Instrumentation
The work is scored for:

Woodwinds
4 flutes (all doubling piccolo)
4 oboes (4th doubling cor anglais)
4 clarinets in A (3rd doubling clarinet in E)
1 bass clarinet in B
3 bassoons
1 contrabassoon

Brass
6 horns in F
4 trumpets in F
4 trombones (3 tenor, 1 bass)
contrabass tuba

Percussion
 2 sets of timpani
percussion (4 players)

celesta
Strings
2 harps

violins I
violins II
violas
violoncellos
double basses

References

Sources
 Lee, Douglas. "Masterworks of 20th Century Music", Routledge, 2002. , 
 Steinberg, Michael. Program Notes for Berg, 3 Pieces for Orchestra. accessed 2009-01-15
 Mark DeVoto. Program Notes for Berg, Three Pieces for Orchestra. accessed February 12, 2010
 Huscher, Philip. Program Notes for Alban Berg, Three Pieces for Orchestra, Op. 6.  accessed 7 August 2014.

External links
 
 Maarten Brandt: Alban Berg: Three pieces for orchestra Op 6 opusklassiek.nl August 2009

Compositions by Alban Berg
20th-century classical music
1915 compositions
Compositions for symphony orchestra